Clyde may refer to:

People
 Clyde (given name)
 Clyde (surname)

Places
For townships see also Clyde Township

Australia
 Clyde, New South Wales
 Clyde, Victoria
 Clyde River, New South Wales

Canada
 Clyde, Alberta
 Clyde, Ontario, a town in North Dumfries, Regional Municipality of Waterloo, Ontario
 Clyde Township, a geographic township in the municipality of Dysart et al, Ontario
 Clyde River, Nunavut

New Zealand
 Clyde, New Zealand
 Clyde Dam

Scotland
 Clydeside
 River Clyde
 Firth of Clyde

United States
 Clyde, California, a CDP in Contra Costa County
 Clyde, Georgia
 Clyde Township, Whiteside County, Illinois
 Clyde, Iowa
 Clyde, Kansas
 Clyde, Michigan
 Clyde Township, Allegan County, Michigan
 Clyde Township, St. Clair County, Michigan
 Clyde, New Jersey
 Clyde, New York
 Clyde, North Carolina
 Clyde, North Dakota
 Clyde, Ohio
 Clyde cancer cluster
 Clyde, Pennsylvania
 Clyde, South Carolina
 Clyde, Texas
 Clyde River (Vermont)
 Clyde, Wisconsin
 Clyde (community), Iowa County, Wisconsin, an unincorporated community
 Clyde, Kewaunee County, Wisconsin, an unincorporated community

Entertainment 
 "Clyde" (song), by J. J. Cale from the album Naturally, later covered by Dr. Hook in 1978 and Waylon Jennings in 1980
 C.L.Y.D.E., a Canadian-French Animated television series

Other uses
 HMNB Clyde, Naval Base at Faslane, Scotland
 Clyde (ship), several ships of this name
 HMS Clyde, several naval ships of this name
 Clyde-class lifeboat, operated by the Royal National Lifeboat Institution between 1968 and 1988
 Clyde F.C., a Scottish football team
 Rolls-Royce Clyde, an early turboprop engine